Abbotsford City Council is the governing body for the City of Abbotsford, British Columbia, Canada.

The council consists of the mayor and eight elected city councillors representing the city as a whole

Municipal elections are held every four years across the Province on the third Saturday of November.

Abbotsford City Council members
Elected in the 2022 municipal election

Council membership

2018-2022
Mayor Henry Braun, Mayor - Independent
R. Bruce Banman, Councillor - Independent (until 2021)
Les Barkman, Councillor - Independent
Sandy Blue, Councillor - AbbotsfordFirst
Kelly Chahal, Councillor - AbbotsfordFirst
Brenda Falk, Councillor - Independent (since 2021) AbbotsfordFirst (2018-2021)
Dave Loewen, Councillor - Independent
Patricia Ross, Councillor - Independent
Dave Sidhu, Councillor - Independent (since 2021)
Ross Siemens, Councillor - AbbotsfordFirst

2014-2018
 Henry Braun, Mayor - Independent
 Les Barkman, Councillor - Independent
 Sandy Blue, Councillor - AbbotsfordFirst  
 Kelly Chahal, Councillor - AbbotsfordFirst
 Brenda Falk, Councillor - AbbotsfordFirst
 Moe Gill, Councillor - Independent
 Dave Loewen, Councillor - Independent
 Patricia Ross, Councillor - Independent
 Ross Siemens, Councillor - AbbotsfordFirst

2011-2014
 Dr. Bruce Banman, Mayor
 Les Barkman, Councillor
 Henry Braun, Councillor
 Bill MacGregor, Councillor
 Simon Gibson, Councillor
 Moe Gill, Councillor
 Dave Loewen, Councillor
 Patricia Ross, Councillor
 John Smith, Councillor

Former Mayors and Councillors

 Ed Fast - Deputy Mayor
 George Peary - Mayor 2008-2011 and City Councillor 1990-2008
 Mary Reeves - former Mayor (2002-2005)
 George F. Ferguson - Mayor of Abbotsford District 1972–1995, Mayor of Abbotsford 1995-2002

References

 Abbotsford City Council
 Abbotsford Blog

Municipal councils in British Columbia
Politics of Abbotsford, British Columbia